Thiosarin, sulfursarin or GBS, is the organophosphorus compound analogous to sarin. It differs structurally in that sulfur replaces the oxygen of the P=O bond. It is an extremely toxic substance related to G-agents.

Characteristics 
For thiosarin, unlike sarin, the literature contains little information. It is reported as a colorless liquid with a characteristic organosulfur odor when pure. It is estimated to have a boiling point of 144-167 °C. It is a more nonpolar compound, with a solubility in water of 7 g/L. Thiosarin probably belongs to the IVA compound series, leaving it much less volatile than sarin. It has a greater persistence in the environment than sarin.

Absorption frequencies of sarin derivatives showed that the frequency of stretching of the P-F and P=S bond of thiosarin is lower than that of its oxygenated analogue.

CW history and candidate 
Its toxicity was discovered in the 1970s by Friedrick Wilhelm Hoffmann and Ray King Irino. They were responsible for synthesizing and analyzing a series of sulfur G-agent compounds. The open literature reports that the compound has been cataloged as GS, but this statement is incorrect, it belongs to EA-1246. GS agents are a series of G compounds. GBS is generally lower than sarin. The little open military literature may be due to the low toxicity of this series of compounds.

The possibility of a chemical warfare agent candidate was raised when Bogomazov and his colleagues discovered that thiosarin had the ability to break through military gas mask filters, where it would then be converted to its analogue.</ref> An investigation by Vil Mirzayanov refuted these results.

Thiosarin is used as a precursor to sarin.

Synthesis 
The preparation route is quite similar to that of sarin. The synthesis routes of thiosarin are manifold.

Regardless of the synthesis route chosen, the final reaction is usually the reaction of isopropyl methylthiophosphonochloridate with fluorides.

Reactions 
Thiosarin has a tendency to convert to its analogue by different mechanisms. In anhydrous medium, thiosarin is oxidized to form GB.

In the controlated aqueous medium, without the presence of oxygen, the tendency is to evolve hydrogen sulfide.
Sulfur is more nucleophilic and tends to form the thiolate isomer at ~100 °C.

Sarin-S 
Along with the discovery of the high toxicity of this series of compounds, Hoffmann discovered that the S-alkyl isomers, unlike the alkyl alkylphosphonothiol compounds, were less toxic than the G(S) agents.

References 

Nerve agents
G-series nerve agents
Acetylcholinesterase inhibitors
Isopropyl esters
Methylphosphonofluoridates
Sulfur compounds